Leko is a surname. Notable people with the surname include:

 Ivan Leko (born 1978), Croatian footballer
 Jerko Leko (born 1980), Croatian footballer
 Jonathan Leko (born 1999), Congolese-English footballer
 Josip Leko (born 1948), Croatian politician and Speaker of the Croatian Parliament
 Marko Leko (1853–1932), Serbian chemist and president of the Serbian Red Cross
 Dimitrije T. Leko (1863–1914), Serbian architect
 Peter Leko (born 1979), Hungarian chess player
 Stefan Leko (born 1974), German-Croatian kickboxer